Madinaty (  , "My City") is an 8000 acre real estate development project, in the New  Cairo satellite city, in the Eastern Area of Cairo, Egypt.

Overview
The project is developed by the Arab Company for Projects and Urban Development SAE, a subsidiary of the EGX listed Talaat Mostafa Group Holding which is ultimately majority owned by the Egyptian Talaat Mostafa, and the Saudi Bin Laden families. The Master Planners are HHCP Design International, Inc. The landscape architects are the SWA group. Construction began in July 2006.

The contract by which the land was granted to the company was challenged in Egyptian courts. Egyptians were angered that the land had been sold below current market value to Talaat Mostafa Group during Mubarak's rule.

In 2016, around 3900 residential units were sold in Madinaty by the Ministry of Housing.

Madinaty has wide streets and the city is designed in terms of sub-compounds where each sub-compound has its facilities in terms of supermarkets, a mosque, an outpatient clinic, and public parks for children to play in and families.

Madinaty has 2 malls with various shops including a mechanic's shop and restaurants. Another food court was recently opened called South Park with dozens of restaurants such as McDonald's, Pizza Hut, Hardee's, and Chili's.

Madinaty has a large club with several pools, playgrounds, gym and clubhouse.

Infrastructure

Madinaty uses Advanced Metering Infrastructure for water and electricity distribution.

Climate
Köppen-Geiger climate classification system classifies its climate as hot desert (BWh) as the rest of Egypt.

See also
 New Urban Communities Authority
 Talaat Mostafa Group Holding
 New Cairo
 New Heliopolis

References

External links
Official website

Populated places in Cairo Governorate